The 2014 M&M Meat Shops Canadian Junior Curling Championships were held from January 18 to 26 at the Queens Place Emera Centre and the Liverpool Curling Club. The winners represented Canada at the 2014 World Junior Curling Championships in Flims, Switzerland.

Men

Round Robin Standings
Final Round Robin Standings

Championship Pool Standings
Final Standings

Playoffs

Semifinal
Sunday, January 26, 9:30 am

Final
Sunday, January 26, 4:00 pm

Women

Round Robin Standings
Final Round Robin Standings

Championship Pool Standings
Final Standings

Playoffs

Semifinal
Saturday, January 25, 9:30 am

Final
Saturday, January 25, 4:00 pm

Qualification

The Junior Provincials are being held December 27–30 at the Re/Max Centre in St. John's. Junior Women's will be a double round robin; Junior Men's will be a single round robin. For the playoffs, the Junior Women's division will have the top two teams advancing to the playoffs; Junior Men's division will have the top three teams advancing to the playoffs. If a team goes undefeated in the round robin, they must be beaten twice in the playoffs.

Results:

Men's semi final: Trickett 9 - Blyde 4
Men's final 1: Bryson 3 - Trickett 9
Men's final 2: Bryson 6 - Trickett 7
Women's final 1: Hill 6 - Rolling 7
Women's final 2: Hill 10 - Rolling 5

The 2014 AMJ Campbell NS Junior Provincials are being held December 27–31 at the Lakeshore Curling Club in Lower Sackville. The event is a modified triple knock-out qualifying three teams in a modified playoff.

Pre-Playoff Results:

Playoff Results:

Men's semi final: Mayhew 8 - Manuel 3
Men's final (N/A): Mayhew vs Mayhew
Women's semi final: Fay 9 - Dwyer 2
Women's final: Myketyn-Driscoll 4 - Fay 9

The Pepsi PEI Provincial Junior Curling Championships are being held December 19–23 at the Silver Fox Curling & Yacht Club in Summerside.

The junior men will play a triple-knockout format, which will qualify four teams for a Page championship round. The junior women will play a single-pool round robin, with the top three teams advancing to the championship round.

Pre-Playoff Results:

Playoff Results:
Men's 1v2: Holland 8 - MacLean 0
Men's 3v4: MacFadyen 4 - Smith 7
Men's semi final: MacLean 4 - Smith 8
Men's final: Holland 8 - Smith 5
Women's semi final: MacLean 7 - Keen 6
Women's final: Smith 6 - MacLean 4

The O'Leary Junior Provincial Championships are being held December 27–30 at the Thistle St. Andrews Curling Club in Saint John. The event is a triple-knockout event. Due to power outages, the venue was changed from the Riverside Country Club in Rothesay to Thistle St. Andrews Curling Club and started on December 28. The Emily Wood team out of the Bathurst Curling Club also withdrew.

Results:

Men's semi final: Comeau 11 - Watts 10
Men's final (N/A): Comeau vs Comeau
Women's semi final: Daigle 7 - Hubbard 3
Women's final: Crook 5 - Daigle 7

The Quebec Provincial Junior Championships are being held from December 26–31 at the Club de Curling Glenmore in Dollard-des-Ormeaux, Quebec.

The event is a round-robin with a modified playoff.

Men's semi final: Bornais 5 - Freilich 8
Men's final: Fajertag 4 - Freilich 11
Women's tie-breaker: Davies 7 - Girard 3
Women's semi final: Guénard 5 - Davies 7
Women's final: Dumais 6 - Davies 1

The Pepsi Ontario Junior Curling Championships are being held January 2–6 at the Gananoque Curling Club in Gananoque, Ontario.

Results:

Men's tie-breaker: Bevan 9 - Hall 7
Men's semi final: Reid 5 - Bevan 3
Men's final: McCrady 9 - Reid 3
Women's semi final: Haymes 8 - Brandwood 5
Women's final: Greenwood 10 - Haymes 7

The Junior Provincial Championships are being held January 2–5 at the Longlac Curling Club in Longlac (men's) and the Fort William Curling Club in Thunder Bay (women's).

Results:

Men's semi final: Horgan 8 - Tetreault 6
Men's final: Potter 4 - Horgan 6
Women's semi final: Beaudry 12 - Smith 3
Women's final: Burns 5 - Beaudry 3

The Canola Junior Provincial Championships are being held December 26–31 at the Portage Curling Club in Portage la Prairie, Manitoba.

Results:

Men's B1 vs R1: Dunstone 7 - Peters 6
Men's B2 vs R2: Calvert 9 - Doering 2
Men's semi final: Peters 4 - Calvert 6
Men's final: Dunstone 1 - Calvert 6
Women's Black Group tie-breaker: Burtnyk 4 - Watling 7
Women's B1 vs R1: Brezden 10 - Grenkow 1
Women's B2 vs R2: Watling 6 - Birchard 5
Women's semi final: Grenkow 4 - Watling 7
Women's final: Brezden 8 - Watling 2

The Junior Provincial Championships are being held December 27–31 at the Twin Rivers Curling Club in North Battleford.

Men's A1 vs. B1: Scharback 3 - Hartung 6
Men's A2 vs. B2: Tenetuik 4 - Lang 7
Men's semi final: Scharback 7 - Lang 9
Men's final: Hartung 9 – Lang 7
Women's A1 vs. B1: Hanson 7 - Schneider 2
Women's A2 vs. B2: Bertsch 2 - Streifel 7
Women's semi final: Schneider 5 - Streifel 6
Women's final: Hanson 7 – Streifel 8

The Subway Junior Provincials are being held December 26–31 at the Leduc Curling Club in Leduc, Alberta.

Results:

Men's tie-breaker 1: Maschmeyer 8 - Harty 5
Men's tie-breaker 2: Vavrek 8 - Maschmeyer 2
Men's semi final: Scoffin 8 - Vavrek 7
Men's final: Lautner 7 - Scoffin 4
Women's tie-breaker 1: DeJong 3 - Sturmay 4
Women's semi final: Peterman 5 - Sturmay 4
Women's final: Rocque 6 - Peterman 5

The Tim Horton's Junior Provincial Championships are being held December 26–31 at the Chilliwack Curling Club in Chilliwack, British Columbia.

Results:

Men's semi final: de Jong 7 - Reid 2
Men's final: Tardi 5 - de Jong 10
Women's tie-breaker: Hawes 3 - Jensen 9
Women's semi final: Van Osch 10 - Jensen 3
Women's final: Brown 6 - Van Osch 7

Hosted Dec. 21-22 at the Whitehorse Curling Club 
Men's Winners: Joe Wallingham defeated Christopher Nerysoo
Women's Winners: Sarah Koltun defeated Bailey Horte

Hosted Dec. 19-22 at Hay River

Results:

Men's Tie-Breaker: Miller 9 - Gagnier 7
Women's winner: Carina McKay-Saturnino (Inuvik) defeated Olivia Gibbons (Hay River)

Women: Sadie Pinksen (Iqaluit CC)
Men: Jamie Airut (Qavik CC)

Awards
The all-star teams and award winners are as follows:

All-Star Teams
Women
First Team
Skip:  Kelsey Rocque, Alberta 79%
Third:  Marika Van Osch, British Columbia 81%
Second:  Sarah Daniels, British Columbia 80%
Lead:  Karlee Korchinski, Saskatchewan 82%

Second Team
Skip:  Mary Fay, Nova Scotia 73%
Third:  Amy Heitzner, Ontario 77%
Second:  Karlee Burgess, Nova Scotia 76%
Lead:  Ashley Sanderson, British Columbia 80%

Men
First Team
Skip:  Carter Lautner, Alberta 80%
Third:  Michael Brophy, Nova Scotia 80%
Second:  Lucas Van Den Bosch, Manitoba 81%
Lead:  Jason Olsthoorn, Quebec 81%

Second Team
Skip:  Ryan McCrady, Ontario 77%
Third:  Daniel Wenzek, New Brunswick 79%
Second:  David Aho, Alberta 79%
Lead:  Cole Lyon-Hatcher, Ontario 81%

Ken Watson Sportsmanship Awards
Women
 Patty Wallingham, Yukon second
Men
 Taylor Ardriel, Alberta third

Fair Play Awards
Women
Lead:  Hilary Charlie, Northwest Territories
Second:  Danielle Lafleur, Manitoba
Third:  Abby Ackland, Manitoba
Skip:  Carina McKay-Saturnino, Northwest Territories
Coach:  Dale McEwen, Manitoba

Men
Lead:  Deklen Crocker, Northwest Territories
Second:  Alex Sutherland, Prince Edward Island
Third:  Connor Faulkner, Nunavut
Skip:  Rene Comeau, New Brunswick
Coach:  Tom Clasper, Manitoba

ASHAM National Coaching Awards
Women
 Nick Saturnino, Northwest Territories
Men
 Tom Clasper, Manitoba

Joan Mead Legacy Awards
Women
 Cathlia Ward, New Brunswick Third
Men
 Cole Lyon-Hatcher, Ontario Lead

References

External links

Junior Championships
Canadian Junior Curling Championships, 2014
Region of Queens Municipality
Canadian Junior Curling Championships
Canadian Junior Curling Championships
Canadian Junior Curling Championships